Daniel P. Coughlin,  (born November 8, 1934) served as the 59th Chaplain of the United States House of Representatives from March 23, 2000, to April 14, 2011. He was the first Roman Catholic priest to serve in that position, and the process that led to his selection included some controversy.  However, as a 2010 article in The Washington Post pointed out, on the occasion of Coughlin's tenth anniversary in the House Chaplain position, "there is ample evidence that the rancor that accompanied his selection has disappeared: Last week, lawmakers from both parties streamed onto the House floor to honor his decade of service."

Life and early priesthood
Coughlin was born November 8, 1934, in Illinois.

The son of Dan and Lucille Coughlin, he was raised on the North side of Chicago and graduated from St. Mary of the Lake Seminary in Mundelein, Illinois, with a degree in Theology. Coughlin was ordained for the Roman Catholic Archdiocese of Chicago on May 3, 1960. In 1968 he received a degree in Pastoral Studies from Loyola University, Chicago.

From 1985 to 1990 Coughlin was pastor at St. Francis Xavier Parish in La Grange, Illinois. He then became Director of the Cardinal Stritch Retreat House in Mundelein, Illinois. In 1995 he began working as Vicar for Priests of the Archdiocese of Chicago under Joseph Bernardin and later Francis George. His work both at the retreat house and in his role as Vicar for Priests—a position that included offering pastoral care to priests, including those involved in sexual abuse cases—would later lead to accusations of impropriety (that he was somehow involved with the overall problem of covering up sex crimes within the Catholic Church) later in his career.

Coughlin's role was, in his words, a "pastor for priests," helping priests "comply with whatever protocols the archdiocese mandated," rather than making decisions about how accused priests should be managed. The Catholic League for Religious and Civil Rights called any allegations of wrongdoing on Coughlin's part a "witch hunt." Coughlin held the position of Vicar for Priests until he was sworn in as House Chaplain.

During the mid-1980s, during a sabbatical from his work in Illinois, he lived and worked with Trappist monks in Kentucky's Gethsemani Abbey, and worked in India with Calcutta's Missionaries of Charity.  He has also served on numerous national and international committees focusing on the subjects of spirituality and renewal in prayer, and served as a scholar-in-residence at the North American College in Rome.  He is also a contributor to "The Spiritual Renewal of the American Priesthood," a publication of the National Conference of Catholic Bishops.

House of Representatives

Selection process controversy
The selection of the 59th Chaplain of the House of Representatives was a controversial process prior to Coughlin's eventual selection. Then House Speaker Dennis Hastert appointed a bipartisan search committee made up of 18 congressional members to recommend a new chaplain to him, but when that committee reportedly recommended a Roman Catholic priest, Father Timothy O'Brien (selected by secret ballot after consideration of more than 50 applicants and nominees for the position), Hastert chose Presbyterian minister Charles Parker Wright instead.

In a "personal privilege" address to Congress on March 20, 2009, Hastert denied that O'Brien's name was given to him as the first choice of the committee, instead saying that O'Brien's name was the first of the final three names submitted to him because the names were in alphabetical order, not numerical ranking.

Hastert's decision not to select O'Brien led to accusations of anti-Catholic bias, and ultimately resulted in Rev. Wright's decision to withdraw his name from consideration. Press reports of Hastert's "surprise compromise selection of a Chicago Catholic priest" covered the story of the Speaker's decision as a way of defusing the controversy.

Hastert, a native of and representative from Illinois, had his staff reach out to Chicago's Archbishop, Francis Cardinal George, for a recommendation of a priest to fill the role of House Chaplain.

Selection
Daniel Coughlin, Cardinal George's recommendation and Hastert's ultimate selection, was described as a 65-year-old "gentle, soft-spoken priest," who said he was "blown away" by the news that he had been "plucked out of obscurity for the job and thrust into the middle of a political maelstrom."  Responding to a reporter's comment that he was being thrown into a "lion's den," Coughlin noted that perhaps it was fitting that his name was "Daniel."

Hastert formally interviewed Coughlin on March 13, 2000, and Coughlin was sworn in as the fifty-ninth Chaplain of the House of Representatives on March 23, beginning his service with the 106th Congress. Since he was named while congress was in session, he served as Acting Chaplain throughout the remainder of the 106th Congress, formally elected to a full term as House Chaplain on January 3, 2001, when the 107th Congress convened.

Service
As House Chaplain, Coughlin opened every session with a prayer, either delivering it himself or coordinating the service of a guest chaplain (often nominated by members of the House, representing their home districts). Coughlin has noted that "Welcoming guest chaplains is one of the very rewarding things I do. It shows the breadth and depth of the religious experience in the U.S., and is a shining beacon of religious liberty."  He has also shared his belief in "prayer and the power of prayer," and its power to "bring about change in the nation's capital."

As House Chaplain, he also offered and coordinated pastoral counseling to the House community, and his office coordinated a website with information about worship services and upcoming special events in the areas of religion and faith in the Capitol Hill and Washington, D.C., area.

Coughlin has noted that he "sensed how deeply lawmakers value prayer and the presence of the chaplain in the halls of Congress" after the September 11 attacks. He has noted that his understanding of this need brought "a further gravity to his duties."

Coughlin has sometimes referred to the "House family," to which he offers pastoral care regardless of the religions of its members and staffers, or whether individuals identify with a religious faith at all.  For example, during the 110th Congress, when six House members died, Coughlin sensed the pain of Congress, even while he worked with families and ceremonies linked to this unusually high number of deaths.

He has spoken of a special pain on the part of Catholic members during debates within the Catholic Church over withholding Holy Communion from public officials whose votes (especially votes that could be interpreted as "pro-choice") were interpreted as being antithetical to Church teaching.

Referring to such debates as "very upsetting," Coughlin said that he "talked to members of the hierarchy on that as well as members of the House," telling Church leaders that he would "stay with my people whatever you do. I will be with my people whatever you do. I will hear them out. I will be with them." Coughlin has called this situation – the threat of using the liturgy "as a threat" – "one of the saddest stories I heard."

When asked whether a Catholic priest with his own theological beliefs can minister to the spiritual needs of men and women of all faiths, he acknowledged his own "limitations". Therefore,  he met with ministers, rabbis, and other religious leaders to "refer members of Congress to people who speak their spiritual language."  He also noted that "We have many more common concerns than differences," and that many conversations are not linked to any one religion's theological beliefs.

Coughlin's service to the members and staffs of the House have earned him praise from both sides of the aisle. In 2010, then-Speaker Nancy Pelosi described him by saying that "He has seen us through the dark and through the bright," and Representative Jim Sensenbrenner (R-Wis.) confessed to being "a better person for having known Father Coughlin and having been counseled by him." Representative Daniel Lipinski (D-Ill.) called him "an inspiration."

Honors and awards
His awards and recognitions include the Distinguished Service Award from the Washington Theological Union in October 2006, the Alumni Extraordinary Service Award from the Institute of Pastoral Studies at Loyola University, and an Honorary Doctorate in Theology from Lewis University.  In addition, House Resolution 1216, introduced in 2010 by Congressman Dan Lipinski to honor Coughlin's first ten years as House Chaplain, was passed by a vote of 412-0. In 2002 he received the John F. Kennedy National Award by the Saint Patrick's Committee of Holyoke, MA, presented annually to an American of Irish descent who has distinguished oneself in one's chosen field.

Successor
A search for Coughlin's successor as House Chaplain was begun shortly before his retirement, with final approval in the hands of House Speaker John Boehner. In a 2011 audio interview with America magazine conducted two weeks before his retirement, Coughlin asked that citizens not only pray for all congressional members "by name," but also pray for the new House Chaplain.

Coughlin noted that "If the chaplain is not a man of prayer -- or a person of prayer -- and a person of peace, we're good for nobody." On May 6, 2011, an announcement was made that Fr. Patrick J. Conroy was nominated to be the 60th Chaplain of the House of Representatives.

Picture gallery

See also
 Chaplain
 Chaplain of the United States House of Representatives
 Chaplain of the United States Senate

References

External links

 C-span video and transcript:Then-speaker Dennis Hasbert speaks to House about his decision to appoint Coughlin after controversial search process.
.
 April 2011 audio interview: America Magazine podcast, with Fr. Coughlin, looking back over 11 years of service.
 Video: President Obama's Inauguration Day Luncheon, concluding with benediction by Fr. Coughlin.
C-Span Video: Post 9/11 panel discussion on Race, Ethnicity, and Culture, sponsored by National Conference on Community and Justice, featuring Coughlin as one panelist/speaker, 2002.
 Official website of the Chaplain of the U.S. House of Representatives
 House resolution honoring Coughlin's tenth year of service as House Chaplain.
 Remarks of Nancy Pelosi in recognition of Coughlin's first ten years as chaplain.
 Coughlin's prayer at Congressional service commemorating 2011 shootings in Tucson, Arizona.
Coughlin's invocation at funeral of former President Gerald Ford.
 C-span video: Fr Coughlin's final prayer as House Chaplain, followed by tributes by Speaker Boehner and Minority Leader Pelosi.
CRS Report: House and Senate Chaplains

1934 births
Loyola University Chicago alumni
University of Saint Mary of the Lake alumni
American Roman Catholic priests
Chaplains of the United States House of Representatives
Living people
21st-century American politicians